XHTIX-FM is a radio station on 100.1 FM in Temixco, Morelos, Mexico, primarily serving Cuernavaca. It is known as W Radio.

History
XHTIX received its concession on November 3, 1994. It was originally known as Factor 100 and later W Radical; when that format was abandoned on XEW-FM in Mexico City, it became known as Radiológico in the early 2000s. It was owned by Stella Generosa Mejido Hernández until 2012.

In 2020, XHTIX affiliated with Radiópolis and began airing W Radio programming. The Radiológico name was modified to Radiológico W and then to W Radio in 2021.

References

Radio stations in Morelos